Ryan Willits (born 23 January 1987 in Melbourne, Victoria) is a former professional Australian rules footballer who played for the Port Adelaide Football Club in the Australian Football League (AFL). He also played for the Glenelg Football Club and West Adelaide Football Club in the South Australian National Football League (SANFL).

Career
Willits debuted for Port late in the 2006 AFL season, playing three games and totalling 25 disposals. In 2007 Willits was delisted by Port Adelaide, before being relisted as a rookie. He was delisted again in 2008, which ended his career at Port Adelaide.

Willits moved to West Adelaide in April 2007 to seek more opportunities to play in a forward role and led the Bloods goal kicking in both 2008 and 2009. 

Willits returned to Melbourne after West Adelaide's 2012 SANFL Grand Final loss to Norwood; he signed to play for Northern Football League (NF L) club Montmorency for the 2013 season. 

At the end of 2014, Willits announced his intentions to return to Adelaide. His relocation to Adelaide saw him return to playing for West Adelaide for the 2015 SANFL season.

References

External links
Official AFL Website of the Port Adelaide Football Club - Official Player Profile

West Adelaide Football Club player profile

1987 births
Australian rules footballers from Melbourne
Living people
Port Adelaide Football Club players
Port Adelaide Football Club players (all competitions)
West Adelaide Football Club players
Glenelg Football Club players
Northern Knights players
Montmorency Football Club players